In neuropsychopharmacology, uncoupling, also known as decoupling, is the process of receptor- or ligand-binding sites or domains becoming separated, moving alignments and/or becoming internalised as a result of drug tolerance resulting from prolonged exposure to bioavailable psychoactive substances or toxins.

References

Neuropharmacology
Molecular neuroscience